Matang Sinh (August 1953 – 6 May 2021) was a leader of Indian National Congress and a former union minister of India.

Biography
He was elected to Rajya Sabha from Assam in 1992 and served as union minister of state in parliamentary affairs from 1994 to 1998.

Sinh was arrested by CBI on 31 January 2015 for his alleged involvement in Saradha Chit Fund Scam. His ex-wife Manoranjana Singh was also found to be involved in the scam. He died on 6 May 2021, from COVID-19 complications.

References

1953 births
2021 deaths
Indian National Congress politicians from Assam
Rajya Sabha members from Assam
Indian prisoners and detainees
People from Tinsukia district
Deaths from the COVID-19 pandemic in India